Ewa Gargulinska (born 27 August 1941 in Kraków, Poland) is a Polish painter. She is known for her Romantic Expressionist work. Gargulinska was a visiting lecturer at The School of Visual Arts in New York, US, from 1982 to 1983 and Central Saint Martins, London, England, from 1984 to 2011. Gargulinska currently lives and works in London, England.

Life 
Gargulinska was born into a family of old Polish nobility from Lwów and Kraków. During the Second World War her family's estate was confiscated by the Russians when they invaded Lwów. Subsequently, Gargulinska's paternal grandmother was taken to a camp in Siberia where she was later liberated by General Sikorski's army and took part in its exodus through the Middle East. Gargulinska, her mother and maternal grandmother were taken to Pawiak concentration camp during the Warsaw uprising and escaped before it was destroyed by the Nazi's.

After the war Gargulinska and her family moved to Sopot, a sea side resort where there were more work opportunities for her father. Gargulinska attended primary school there until her parents divorced and the family moved back to her grandmother's apartment in Kraków. The numerous relocations the family had to endure interfered with Gargulinska's education causing her to have a sense of displacement, however, it encouraged the development of her artistic talent.

After a three-month stay in Paris at the age of seventeen, Gargulinska decided to change her initial plan to study French Philology, and entered the Academy of Fine Art in Kraków. After a year studying in Kraków she moved to the Academy of Fine Art in Warsaw, the leading art school in Poland, providing new teaching methods from Bauhaus as well as the Russian avant garde movement.

Gargulinska's studies included tuition under Professor Henryk Tomaszewski (the most influential poster designer of his day). Poster Design became a new futuristic art form, considered at the time to surpass traditional fine art for its imaginative expression. Gargulinska received her MA degree from the Academy of Fine Art in Warsaw 1960-1966. Her work from this period was taken into the Academy of Fine Arts Archive and exhibited at The Young Talents exhibition at Foksal Gallery in Warsaw.

During the rise of the Polish Film School movement poster art reached its peak and was enthusiastically received in the west. Gargulinska's poster images were shown in a group exhibition at the ICA in London in 1971. In 1972 Gargulinska managed to obtain permission from the communist security office to travel to London where she worked as a set and textile designer as well as a visual artist for a year. In 1973 she was required to return to Warsaw. Following a disturbing incident with the communist secret police Gargulinska decided to leave Poland permanently which was forbidden under the communist regime. A German friend helped Gargulinska across the border and took her to Hamburg. While waiting for an English Visa Gargulinska sold her first paintings and images of film posters to private clients in order to survive.

Following her return to London 'Gargulinska's versatility has been apparent through her wide-ranging career. Her art has been exhibited internationally and is represented in several public collections including: the National Museum of Women in the Arts, Washington DC and the "Zacheta" National Gallery of Contemporary Art in Warsaw, Poland. Her paintings are collected worldwide, most notably by Doctor Arthur Sackler (founder of the new wing at the Royal Academy, London and the extensions to the Metropolitan and Smithsonian Museums in the United States), Cusacks, Jeremy Irons, Sir Michael Scott and Vernon Ellis, Chairman of the English National Opera. She has painted portraits in New York, designed theatre sets for the Gate Theatre in Dublin, posters for Madam Tussauds in London.'

Gargulinska's work 
Stylistically a romantic expressionist, Gargulinska's work interchanges the abstract and figurative in unpredictable, powerful combinations. Gargulinska's paintings often include subjects from Greek mythology where the dramatic portrayal of human emotions expresses her creative imagination at its best.

Red in Drama, Myth and Miracle 

Royal National Theatre, 2010

"The inverse of Horace's 'ut pictura poesis', here we have painting like poetry, the poetry of W B Yeats or Ezra Pound, for instance. Indeed one might say that Ewa Gargulinska has brought the poetry back into painting. Poetry is a free association of ideas and images within a loose, but not altogether disconnected, framework. Gargulinska's framework is classical mythology, the sculpture representing it, and modern psychology. These two are not entirely alien to each other, as Freud has shown. Of particular interest is that images emerge out of the paint, as it were, and rarely reach anything like naturalism. This is truly painterly poetry, the most fascinating aspect of which is the emerging mirror-image."

These works, rendered in a variety of reds, from subtle orange to deep Alizarin and brown Madders are drawn from the subjects of mythology and drama. Gargulinska's powerful use of colour and form symbolically represents the tragic and timeless history of human relationships.

Mysteries 

Royal National Theatre, 2004

The Irish poet Seamus Heaney, with his Polish friend Stanislaw Baranczak recently translated a book of ‘Laments’ by the Renaissance Polish poet Jan Kochanowski.

These beautiful, passionate outpourings of grief on the death of his two-year-old daughter are a perfect expression of that Polish intensity of feeling which surfaces in Ewa Gargulinska's dark, brooding paintings. Her consistent colour range of deep blue, red, purple, offset by occasional outbursts of acid yellow, explores a world of melancholy and sorrow, the ‘haunts of pain’ of the poets mourning.

But the active surface of the paintings nevertheless bespeaks the living rather than the dead. The compassionate presence of the guardian spirit wards off ‘the eternal iron slumbers’ of despair, by the power of art ‘to purge our human thought of all its dread’, ‘where angels dwell beyond distress and fear.’ 

The dream like mood of her dark painting form this era brings to mind the Romantic Movement in art of 1800 with its surreal mysticism, reflection upon life, death and the unconscious.  The poetic expression of the artist's inner world collides and fuses with reality, thus it represents the duality of existence by contrast of the abstract and figurative forms of expression.

“I use metaphors and mythology to express emotional, spiritual and metaphysical states of mind, relating to my experiences of life's mysteries. I draw images from both my imagination and collective symbolism, pondering how spirit animates matter and how it leaves the body.”

The Dilemma of Three 

Beijing Exhibition, 2010

Gargulinska focuses on the complexity and dynamic of three; creating figurative yet elusive forms of intermingled heads or faces, each portraying a different emotional state, nature and tension. All three are interdependent but connected, some faces dissolve into one another, overlapping in an immaterial or static space. The range of colour is subdued and subtle. Gargulinska uses muted yellows, brown-greens, and grey-blues in many translucent layers. The paintings in this series reflect upon the experience of the individual, the selves one carries within or the drama shared by three personas.

“During my life and career as an exhibiting artist I have changed my modes of expression many times from figurative to abstract, from dark, obscure, ephemeral, reflective painting to passionate free manifestations of form, colour, and texture. The latter has become my life time search and my forte. The impulse to represent beauty in physical and metaphysical aspects renders my paintings with an almost classical perfection, followed by periods of complete liberation from its restraints. Ultimately two modes of expression: the abstract and figurative appear in the same painting, which I explore to this day. I am always anticipating the birth of something unexpected, a new road to harmony, hopefully on the path of Titian.”

Collections

Public Collections 

 National Museum, Kraków
 Madame Tussauds Museum, London
 National Museum of Women in the Arts Archives, Washington DC
 National Gallery Zacheta Archives, Warsaw
 Copernicus University Archives, Torun
 Academy of Fine Arts Archives, Warsaw

Private Collections 

 Arthur M Sackler Collections, New York City
 Sir Michael Scott, Ireland
 Jeremy Irons, England
 Cyril Cusack, Ireland
 Vernon Ellis, Chairman of the English National Opera, London
 Lionel de Rothschild, England

Exhibitions 

 1966 — Young Talents, Foksal Gallery, Warsaw
 1971 — ICA Group exhibition, London
 1972 — Project Arts Centre, Dublin
 1976 — Caldwell Gallery, Dublin
 1976 — Polish Cultural Institute, London
 1981 — Jablonski Gallery, London
 1989 — Central College of Art, London
 1989 — International Exhibition of Women Painters, Paris
 1991 — Piano Nobile Gallery, Kraków
 1992 — Polish Artists Association, London
 1994 — Polish Cultural Institute, London
 1995 — Dillon Gallery, London
 1995 — Flaminia 58, Rome
 1995 — Polish Cultural Institute, Rome
 1996 — Polish Cultural Institute, Stockholm
 1997 — Groucho Club, London
 1998 — Soho House, London
 1999 — Royal National Theatre, London
 2003 — Hutson Gallery, London
 2003 — Rue de Phalsbourg, Paris
 2004 — Royal National Theatre, London
 2006 — Traffic Gallery, Warsaw
 2008 — Museo de la Cultura Maya, Mexico
 2010 — Embassy House, Beijing
 2010 — Oxford University, Oxford
 2010 — Polish Embassy, Beijing

Commissions 

 Dr Arthur M Sackler, New York
 International Medical Syndicate, New York
 Gate Theatre, Dublin — Set design and poster
 Sybil Connolly exhibition, New York and Chicago — Textile design
 Peter Luke's “Paquito”, Dublin — Illustrations and book design
 Irish Posts and Telegraphs, Dublin — Irish Christmas stamp design
 International Congress of the Society of Industrial Design, Dublin — Exhibition Design
 Abbey Theatre, Dublin — Poster design
 Dublin Theatre Festival — Set design/poster
 Madame Tussauds, London — Poster design

Publications 

 Studio International, London 1984
 Print, New York 1983

References 

1941 births
Living people
Artists from Kraków
20th-century Polish painters
21st-century Polish painters
Polish women painters
Expressionist painters
Academy of Fine Arts in Warsaw alumni
20th-century Polish women